This is a list of people in the chiropractic profession, comprising chiropractors and other people who have been notably connected with the profession. Many are important to the development or practice of chiropractic; they do not necessarily have DC degrees.

B
 Obie Baizley, DC: Manitoba, Canada, Politician

C
 Colin Carrie, DC: Member, House of Commons of Canada
 Terry Chimes, DC: English musician
 Franco Columbu, DC: bodybuilder and friend of Arnold Schwarzenegger.

D
 Ruby Dhalla, DC: Member, House of Commons of Canada
 Mark Day, DC: One of the first Appalachian chiropractors.

F 

 Ahmed Fares: Canadian Board of Chiropractic, Alberta Board of Chiropractic, National Board of Chiropractic , UAE National Chiropractic Board

G
 Martin Gallegos, DC: California Assemblyman
 Jean-Robert Gauthier, DC: Member, House of Commons of Canada
 Clarence Gonstead, DC: expanded upon BJ Palmer's early 1920 ideas for chiropractic practice which later bore his name.
 George Goodheart, DC: developer of "Applied Kinesiology", and 1st US Olympic Team DC.
 Gary Goodyear, DC: Member, House of Commons of Canada

H
 Scott Haldeman, DC, PhD, MD: medical neurologist, chiropractor, founder of World Spine Care, uncle of Elon Musk.
 Gerry E. Hinton, DC: Louisiana Senator
 Suzanna Hupp, DC: Texas State Representative
 Tom Hyde, DC, Florida Chiropractor who was Team USA, Doctor for the 1987 Pan Am Games, and the 8th Chiropractor to be selected to work at the US Olympic Training Center in Colorado Springs.

I
 Teddy Infuhr, DC: child actor
 William Ivens, DC: Member, Manitoba, Canada Legislature

J
 Joseph Janse, DC: helped found the independently chartered Council on Chiropractic Education (CCE). As President of National College, (now known as National University of Health Sciences), he led the institution to become the first chiropractic college to achieve federally recognized status. He was also a renowned anatomist, and established the Journal of Manipulative and Physiological Therapeutics.

K
 Joseph C. Keating, Jr., PhD: (1950–2007) trained as a clinical psychologist who spent the majority of his life teaching and researching the chiropractic profession. He is best known for his published works as a historian of chiropractic.

L

 Jack LaLanne, DC: TV Personality, Body Builder, Inventor, Entrepreneur, Fitness and Nutrition Advocate 
 James Lunney, DC: Member Parliament of Canada

M
 Karyn Marshall, DC: an Olympic weightlifter
 Tom Mason, DC: actor
 Volney Mathison, DC: inventor
 Terrence Murphy (chiropractor), DC: New York State Senator

P
 B.J. Palmer, DC: son of D.D. Palmer.
 D.D. Palmer, DC: founder of what we currently think of as chiropractic during the end of the 19th century.
 Mabel Heath Palmer, DC: first woman in Chiropractic, B.J. Palmer's wife, became a doctor of chiropractic in 1905.
 James W. Parker, DC: Founder of Parker School of Professional Success, a seminar series dedicated to teaching chiropractic business principles, philosophy and various chiropractic techniques. Founder of Share International, the largest supplier of chiropractic goods until about 1995. Founder of the Parker College of Chiropractic, now known as Parker University. 
 Jim Pankiw, DC: former member of the Parliament of Canada

R

 Dennis Richards, DC: Australian doctor elected President of the World Federation of Chiropractic in 2012.

S
 Doug Sharp, DC: Olympic Bobsledder
 Shawn Stasiak, DC: WWF wrestler

T
 Robert N. Thompson, DC: Canadian politician
 Ron Tripp, DC: a World Sambo Champion

W
 Sid E. Williams, DC: founder of Life University
 Nell K. Williams, DC: chiropractor, co-founder of Life University, and the wife of the Dr. Sid E. Williams

References

External links 
 Association for the History of Chiropractic
 History of Chiropractic Archives - Clicking on "Personalities & Events" in the navigation pane takes you to a listing of directories.

List
Chiropractors
Chiropractic